Barry Del Sherman (born November 10, 1962) is an American stage, film, and television actor.

Career 
Sherman is known for roles in such films as Clive Barker's Lord of Illusions; Brad Dupree, the executive who fires Lester Burnham (Kevin Spacey) in American Beauty; and H. B. Ailman, Daniel Plainview's (Daniel Day-Lewis) business partner in There Will Be Blood.

His television acting includes guest appearances on Law & Order, Law & Order: Criminal Intent, CSI: NY, and The Bridge.

Sherman has appeared onstage in Marlane Meyer's The Mystery of Attraction at Tribeca Playhouse in New York and Pierre Marivaux's The False Servant at Odyssey Theater in Los Angeles.

Personal life 
Sherman has been married to actress Alexandra Powers in 1993 and is married to Georgina Reskala since 2005.

Filmography

Film

Television

References

External links

Living people
People from Fontana, California
Male actors from California
American male film actors
American male television actors
1962 births